Sherrilyn Ifill (born December 17, 1962) is an American lawyer. She is a law professor and former president and director-counsel of the NAACP Legal Defense Fund. She was the Legal Defense Fund's seventh president since Thurgood Marshall founded the organization in 1940. Ifill is also a nationally recognized expert on voting rights and judicial selection. In 2021, Time named her one of the 100 most influential people in the world on its annual Time 100 list.

Early life and education
Sherrilyn Ifill was born on December 17, 1962, in Baltimore, Maryland to Lester and Myrtle. She is the youngest of 10 children. Her mother passed away when Ifill was 6 years old. She graduated from Hillcrest High School. Ifill has a B.A. from Vassar College and a J.D. from New York University School of Law.

She and the late PBS NewsHour anchor Gwen Ifill were first cousins. Their family immigrated to the U.S. from Barbados, with Sherrilyn's and Gwen's fathers, who were brothers, both becoming African Methodist Episcopal ministers.

Career
While in law school, Ifill interned for Judge A. Leon Higginbotham Jr. the first summer and at the United Nations Centre for Human Rights the second summer. Her first job out of law school was a one-year fellowship with the American Civil Liberties Union in New York. She then served as assistant counsel at the NAACP's Legal Defense Fund, litigating Voting Rights Act cases including the landmark Houston Lawyers' Association v. Attorney General of Texas. In 1993, she joined the faculty of the University of Maryland Law School, where she taught for two decades. She is the author of On the Courthouse Lawn: Confronting the Legacy of Lynching in the 21st Century, a 2008 finalist for the Hurston-Wright Legacy Award for Nonfiction. In 2013, she became the Legal Defense Fund's president and director-counsel.

Ifill regularly appears in the media for her expertise on topics like affirmative action, policing, judicial nominees, and the Supreme Court. Ifill has announced that she will step down from the role of president and director-counsel in the spring of 2022, to be replaced by Janai Nelson, currently the associate director-counsel at LDF. She joined the Ford Foundation as a Senior Fellow in June 2022. Her writing appears in The New York Review of Books, Salon, The Washington Post, and The New York Times.

Personal life
Ifill is married to Ivo Knobloch. They have three children.

Honors and awards
In 2016, Ifill won the Society of American Law Teachers Great Teacher Award.

Ifill was an American Academy of Arts and Sciences Fellow in 2019. In 2020, Glamour magazine gave her a Woman of the Year award, calling her a "civil rights superhero." In 2021, Ifill was included on the Time 100, Times annual list of the 100 most influential people in the world.

She was selected as the New York State Bar Association 2023 Gold Medal Award recipient, which cited her history as a "tireless warrior for civil rights".

See also 
 Joe Biden Supreme Court candidates

References

External links 

 Sherrilyn Ifill at NAACP LDF
 
 

1962 births
Living people
African-American lawyers
Hillcrest High School alumni (Queens)
Vassar College alumni
New York University School of Law alumni
University of Maryland, Baltimore faculty
People from Jamaica, Queens
American people of Barbadian descent
Lawyers from Queens, New York
20th-century American lawyers
21st-century American lawyers
20th-century American women lawyers
21st-century American women lawyers
20th-century African-American women
20th-century African-American people
21st-century African-American women
21st-century African-American people